Trees Lounge is a 1996 American dramedy film and the debut of Steve Buscemi as writer and director. It was produced by Brad Wyman and Chris Hanley and features a large ensemble cast of actors, including Buscemi, Anthony LaPaglia, Chloë Sevigny, and Samuel L. Jackson. The film's black humor is based on examination of characters' self-destructive behavior, revolving around their shared hangout of the titular bar and lounge.

Critical reception was mostly positive. Trees Lounge has also been cited as an influence by The Sopranos creator David Chase, who later hired Buscemi to direct "Pine Barrens" and three other episodes of the show, and to star as Tony Soprano's cousin Tony Blundetto during the show's fifth season.

It was filmed in Glendale, Queens; Brooklyn; and Valley Stream, New York.

Plot
Tommy Basilio is an alcoholic and fixture at a local bar, the Trees Lounge, who loses his girlfriend of eight years and his job as a mechanic. After his Uncle Al dies while driving his ice cream truck, Tommy goes to his wake and indulges in cocaine with his brother and cousins. Tommy takes them to the Trees Lounge to carry on drinking, but a brawl breaks out between his cousin and Mike, another regular. After buying more beer at a late night convenience store, Mike and Tommy discuss how Tommy stole money from Rob, the owner of the garage where he lost his job. They discuss how Rob is dating Tommy's pregnant ex-girlfriend Theresa, with the child's paternity in doubt.

Mike turns out to be the owner of the moving company across the street from the Trees Lounge. Tommy asks for work, but Mike says he doesn't need a mechanic. Tommy takes on Uncle Al's ice-cream route, but children initially do not buy from him. Theresa's flirtatious seventeen-year-old niece, Debbie, joins Tommy on his route, saying she had a dream about him. Mike's wife and daughter have left him because of his drinking, and tell him they plan to move upstate. Debbie and friend Kelly go to the Trees Lounge but are unable to prove they are of legal drinking age. Debbie claims her 'boyfriend' Tommy will vouch for her. Mike, Tommy and the two girls go to Mike's house for more drinking, but are asked to leave when Mike's wife calls.

Tommy and Debbie spend the night together at his place. Realizing her father, Jerry, might not forgive her, Debbie calls Tommy and asks to stay with him, but he fears Jerry's reaction and turns her down. She instead decides to leave town with her friend Puck to stay with a cousin in New York City. Jerry meanwhile tries to reconstruct his daughter's steps, and visits Trees Lounge to ask questions. The next day, as Tommy sits in the ice cream truck outside a baseball game, chatting with Mike and his wife, Jerry tracks him down. The irate father bashes him on the head with a baseball bat, smashes the lights and windows of the ice-cream truck, and throws all of Tommy's money and ice cream into the parking lot where they are confiscated by gleeful children. After Theresa has her baby, Tommy goes to the hospital and tries to make amends. When Tommy returns to the Trees Lounge, he hears that an elderly regular customer named Bill collapsed and was taken to the hospital in critical condition. The barmaid and other regulars discuss how someone should visit Bill in the hospital, but they forget about him as they carry on drinking. Tommy sits in Bill's favorite seat and drinks a bottle of beer, realizing what his life has become.

Cast

Release
The film premiered at the Directors' Fortnight at the 1996 Cannes Film Festival on May 11, 1996. It was released theatrically in two theaters in the United States on October 11, 1996.

Reception
Trees Lounge has an 81% approval rating based on 26 reviews on Rotten Tomatoes. Roger Ebert gave the film 3½ stars out of 4: 

Trees Lounge earned Buscemi nominations for Best First Screenplay as well as Best First Feature (along with producers Brad Wyman and Chris Wyman) at the 1997 Independent Spirit Awards.

References

External links

1996 films
American black comedy films
American comedy-drama films
Artisan Entertainment films
1996 independent films
Films set in New York (state)
Films directed by Steve Buscemi
Films about alcoholism
Geneon USA
1996 directorial debut films
Films shot in New York (state)
Films shot in New York City
1990s English-language films
1990s American films